Mitegi Lakshmanrekha was an Indian television series, which aired on &TV from 28 May 2018 to 31 August 2018. The show was produced by Shashi Sumeet Mittal and Sumeet Hukamchand Mittal and starred Rahul Sharma and Shivani Tomar.

Plot 
The show revolves around the concept of boundaries for women giving perspective on how it has been twisted to cage and limit women instead of serving their original purpose.

Kanchan is a young woman who has never been weighed down by boundaries. On the surface, she appears to be fearless and put together but is actually battling internal dilemmas. Her life takes a turn when she crosses paths with Vishesh, who has a similar outlook towards life and doesn't give in to the patriarchal mindset of society. Her demons hold her back from giving into her love for him and taking their relationship forward.

Cast
 Rahul Sharma as Vishesh
 Shivani Tomar as Kanchan
 Vaishnavi Mahant as Devyani, Vishesh's mother
 Rahul Lohani as Saurabh Thakur 
 Ravi Gossain as Nandan, Kanchan's father
 Jayshree T. as Dadi
 Amrin Chakkiwala as Ananya, Vishesh's sister
 Akshita Mudgal as Keerti, Kanchan's sister
 Ankita Goraya as Sheetal, Kanchan's cousin
 Nitin  Bhatia as Jaggi, Vishesh's best friend, Sheetal's husband
 Neerav Soni as Shubham, Vishesh's cousin brother
 Ankita Bahuguna as Dhara, Shubham's wife
 Karuna Verma as Shubham's mother, Vishesh aunt (chachi)
 Amit Singh Thakur as Shubham's father, Vishesh's uncle
 Rajeev Saxena as Baldev, Nandan's brother, Kanchan's uncle (Sheetal's father)
  as Dr. Aman (guest), later Devyani's friend's son, Vishesh's childhood friend
 Rishina Kandhari as Trishna Saurabh Thakur, Saurabh's wife
 Avdeep Sidhu as Ananya's husband
 Shrashti Maheshwari as Saurabh's sister
 Ayesha Vindhara as Mishti Thakur, Saurabh and Trishna's daughter

References

2018 Indian television series debuts
Shashi Sumeet Productions series
Indian drama television series
&TV original programming
Hindi-language television shows
2018 Indian television series endings